Plasmodium mabuiae is a parasite of the genus Plasmodium subgenus Carinamoeba.

Like all Plasmodium species P. mabuiae has both vertebrate and insect hosts. The vertebrate hosts for this parasite are reptiles.

Taxonomy

This species was first described by Weyon in 1909 in Sudan.

Description 

The schizonts are less than or equal to the host cell nucleus in size.

Each schizont produces four to eight merozoites.

The Gametocytes are elongate and equal to or slightly larger than host cell nuclei, and are found diagonally across one end of the host cell.

Description 

This species is found in Tanzania (Dar-es-Salaam and Morogoro).

Hosts 

This species infects the African striped skink (Mabuya striata).

References 

mabuiae